Shukto is a popular vegetable dish in Bengali cuisine usually served with rice in the West Bengal state of India and in the neighbouring country Bangladesh. It has slightly bitter taste and is especially served in the banquets of Bengali social ceremonies like Annaprasana, Sraddhya or Bengali Wedding as a part of traditional Bengali thali. 

Shukto has numerous different variations and can be prepared in different ways.

The tradition of starting a meal by consuming bitters, considered to have a medicinal value, dates back to the ancient times and was promoted by the authors of Ayurveda. Shukto was consumed as a cooling agent in the hot and humid climates of the ancient kingdoms of undivided Bengal like Anga, Vanga and Kalinga. Shukto is also said  to have mentions in Mangal-Kāvya, written during the medieval period and in the biographies of Sri Chaitanya.

Variations 
Dudh Shukto is a popular variant which is prepared with milk to alleviate the bitter taste of the dish.

Some variants are made with fish of different sizes. Such variants of Shukto typically use turmeric which is usually absent in the vegetarian variants. Some of the variants even exclude the bitter vegetables and are prepared with fenugreek seeds instead, to preserve the bitterness.

See also 
 Bengali cuisine
 List of Indian dishes
 List of Bangladeshi dishes

References 

Bengali cuisine
Indian vegetable dishes
Bangladeshi vegetable dishes